Charles Fulton Oursler (January 22, 1893 – May 24, 1952) was an American journalist, playwright, editor and writer. Writing as Anthony Abbot, he was an  author of mysteries and detective fiction. His son was the journalist and author Will Oursler (1913–1985).

Background
Oursler was born and grew up in Baltimore, Maryland, the son of a poor city transit worker. His childhood passions were reading and stage magic. He was raised in a devout Baptist family, but at 15, he declared himself an agnostic. While still in his teens, he got a reporter's job for the Baltimore American.

Career
Oursler moved to New York City to edit The Music Trades. He freelanced for a variety of publications early on. His short stories appeared in The Black Cat, Detective Story Magazine, The Thrill Book, and especially Mystery Magazine. Many of his stories, such as "The Magician Detective", incorporate magicians and magic into the plots.

In the 1920s, Oursler aided Harry Houdini in his crusade against fraudulent mediumship. He himself crusaded under the pseudonym Samri Frikell. He was the author of the book Spirit Mediums Exposed (1930), which revealed the techniques of fraud mediums.

John Mulholland wrote that Samri Frikell was the pen name of Oursler when he wrote on the subject of magic and spiritualism. He made it by combining the names of two magicians, Samri Baldwin and Wiljalba Frikell.

He was supervising editor of the various magazines and newspapers published by Bernarr Macfadden, from 1921 to 1941. Macfadden urged him to drop the "Charles" from his name. He became editor of Liberty after Macfadden acquired it in 1931. In the fall of 1939, Fulton Oursler, as editor of Liberty, printed a piece in his magazine called "Alcoholics and God," which brought a rush of 800 frantic inquiries into the New York office of Alcoholics Anonymous, as it was to be known.

Oursler left Macfadden Publications shortly after Macfadden was ousted from the company. Oursler's tenure with the company was continuous from 1921 to 1941, except for a brief period following the success of The Spider (1928).

In 1944, he became a senior editor for Reader's Digest (where his son eventually became managing editor).

Oursler wrote a number of novels.  These include Sandalwood (1925), Stepchild of the Moon (1926) and The World's Delight (1929). He also wrote detective stories and magazine articles under the pseudonym Anthony Abbot, as well as several plays, the most famous of which was the gimmick-filled The Spider (1928), co-written with Lowell Brentano and later filmed twice, in 1931 and 1945. The great success of the play attracted four plagiarism suits, which were successfully defended by Oursler's private attorney, Arthur Garfield Hays.

Personal life
While still in his teens, Oursler married Rose Karger. They had two children. The marriage ended in divorce.

In 1925, Oursler married Grace Perkins, who had been raised Catholic but lapsed in her teens. They had two children, April and Tony. They practiced no religion and did not raise their children in any faith. Perkins, a former actress, was a prodigious contributor to the Macfadden magazines. Several of her novels were made into films.

In 1935, the Oursler family toured the Middle East and spent a week in the Holy Land. On the journey home, Oursler started writing a book titled A Skeptic in the Holy Land. "I started out being very skeptical," he wrote later, "but in the last chapter I almost converted." He assumed that once the book was published, he would forget about religion. However, perceiving the growing threat of Nazism and Communism, he found himself increasingly drawn to Christian ethics. Astounded at how little people knew about the life and teaching of Jesus Christ, he decided that he would write the story of Jesus and "try and make it as interesting as a serial story in a popular magazine." He would call it The Greatest Story Ever Told.

In 1943, Oursler was received into the Roman Catholic Church. The following year, his son was converted to the Catholic faith, and his wife returned to her childhood faith a year later. His daughter converted in 1948. The Greatest Story Ever Told was published in 1949. It was followed by The Greatest Book Ever Written in 1951, and The Greatest Faith Ever Known, completed by his daughter, April Oursler Armstrong, and posthumously published in 1953. The film, The Greatest Story Ever Told, based on Oursler's book, was released in 1965.

Oursler also wrote, as Abbot, the Reader's Digest article that was made into the movie Boomerang! (1947). Another book was Father Flanagan of Boy's Town, 1949, the story of Father Edward J. Flanagan's work with young men. The book was co-authored by Fulton's son Will Oursler, also a noted writer.

He died in New York City in 1952, while halfway through writing his autobiography. Oursler left his estate to his second wife on the understanding that she would leave the estate to his four children. When she died, she only left it to the two children she had with Oursler and the other two successfully sued for their share.

Works

Novels

As Fulton Oursler 

 Behold this Dreamer! (1924)
 Sandalwood (1925)
 Stepchild of the Moon (1926)
 Poor Little Fool
 The World's Delight (1929)
 The Great Jasper (1930)
 Joshua Todd (1935)
A Skeptic In The Holy Land (1936)
Three Things We Can Believe In
A History Of Protestant Missions
The Precious Secret (1947)
Why I Know There Is A God (1950)
 The Greatest Story Ever Told Series:
  Reissue: Image Books, 1989, unabridged

As Anthony Abbot 
 Thatcher Colt Detective Mystery Series:
 About the Murder of Geraldine Foster (1930) a.k.a. The Murder of Geraldine Foster
 About the Murder of the Clergyman's Mistress (1931) a.k.a. The Crime of the Century, The Murder of the Clergyman's Mistress, The Mysterious Murder of the Blonde Play-Girl
 About the Murder of the Night Club Lady (1931) a.k.a. The Night Club Lady, The Murder of the Night Club Lady
 About the Murder of the Circus Queen (1932) a.k.a. The Murder of a Circus Queen
 About the Murder of A Startled Lady (1935) a.k.a. The Murder of a Startled Lady
 About the Murder of A Man Afraid of Women (1937) a.k.a. The Murder of a Man Afraid of Women
 The Creeps (1939) a.k.a. Murder at Buzzards Bay
 The Shudders (1943) a.k.a. Deadly Secret
 The Flower of the Gods (1936, with Achmed Abdullah)
 The Shadow of the Master (1940, with Achmed Abdullah)

As Arnold Foutain 
 Heart's Desire (1929-1930). Novella

As Samri Frikell 
 The Man With Miracle Mind (1921). Novella

Short story collections

As Fulton Oursler 
 ;

As Anthony Abbot 
 These are Strange Tales (1948)

Short stories

As Fulton Oursler 

 "A String of Blue Beads" (1913)
 "The Man Who Didn't Do It" (1915)
 "Chief Bob Carter, Foe of Gamblers" (1916)
 "The Thousand-Dollar Thumb" (1917)
 "Three Who Were Deformed" (1917)
 "The Sign of the Seven Sharks" (1918)
 "Shadowing the Blue Triangle" (1918)
 "The Magician Detective" (1918)
 "The Evil Eye" (1919)
 "The Mystery of the Seven Shadows" (1919)
 "The Whispering Head" (1920)
 "The Clue of the Red Lamp" (1920)
 "The Hand of Judas" (1920, with John Irving Pearce Jr.)
 "Perkins Cans a Louis Quinze" (1920)
 "The Spirit Bell" (1920)
 "The Jeweled Pipe of Persia" (1920)
 "The Spirit Witness" (1921)
 "Professor Satan" (1921)
 "The Man in Room No. 7" (1921)
 "The Trance Detective" (1921)
 "Counterfeit Clues" (1921)
 "A Man from Siam" (1922)
 "A Whispering Mummy" (1922)
 "The District Attorney's Secret" (1922)
 "Charged with His Own Murder" (1922)
 "The Flying Turk" (1922, with John Irving Pearce Jr.)
 "The Stone Yard of Satan: A Story of Horror" (1922)
 "He Fell in Love with a Ghost" (1922)
 "The Mystery of Ten Mummies" (1922)
 "Fear: the Arch Enemy" (1922)
 "A Master of Millions" (1923)
 "The Hand in the Dark" (1923)
 "Forever and Forever, Amen!" (1923)
 "Go and Sin no More!" (1923)
 "One Clue Missing" (1923)
 "The Kind of Man That Ought to Be Shot" (1923)
 "The Footprints on the Ceiling" (1924)
 "The Thrill Is Gone" (1942, with Rupert Hughes)
 "The Wager" (1944)

As Anthony Abbot 

 "The Mystery of Geraldine" (1931)
 "The Perfumed Trail" (1932)
 "Shivering in the Dark" (1932)
 "Ghost Girl" (1932)
 "The President's Mystery Story" (1935)
 Thatcher Colt Detective Mystery Series:
 "About the Disappearance of Agatha King" (1939)
 "About the Perfect Crime of Mr. Digberry" (1940)
 "The Perfect Case" (1945)
 "The Face From Beyond" (1946)
 "The Girl Who Plotted Her Own Murder" (1948)
 "The Ship of Sleepless Men" (1958)

As Arnold Foutain 
 "The Physical Culture Detective" (1926)
 "The Burglar Girl" (1928)

As Samri Frikell 
 "The House of Whispering Shadows" (1922)
 "The Mystery of the Spirit Portrait" (1923)
 "The Strangest Woman in the World" (1923)
 "The Mystery of the Flying Dagger" (1926)

Plays 
 Sandalwood  (Original, Play, Drama) September 22 - October 1926
 The Spider  (Original, Play, Mystery, Melodrama) March 22 - December 1927
 Behold This Dreamer  (Original, Play, Drama) October 31 - December 1927
 The Spider  (Revival, Play, Melodrama, Mystery) February 27 - March 1928
 All the King's Men  (Original, Play, Comedy, Drama) February 4 – March 4, 1929
 The Walking Gentleman  (Original, Play) May 7–12, 1942

Nonfiction

Articles

 "Class Loyalty and Its Part in Success" (1923)
 "Is Hollywood More Sinned Against than Sinning?" (1932)
 "I Am Looking for a Writer" (1934)
 "Strange Stories that Jafsie Told" (1936)
 "Could Landon Keep Us Out of War?" (1936)
 "China's Strong Woman Talks" (1937)
 "Women and Children First" (1937)
 "'I Want Only Peace! I Am Not a Dictator!' Says Mussolini" (1938)
 "Police and Press: An Invincible Partnership" (1939)
 "Inked Out" (1939)
 "The Lady Suggested Sabotage" (1940)
 "The Duke of Winsdor Talks of War and Peace" (1941)
 "Winston Churchill Writes About the U-Boat Menace" (1941)
 "Should the Detective Story Writer Know Anything About Crime?" (as Anthony Abbot) (1945)
 "Whose Business Was It?" (1948)
 "The Mistake" (1950)
 "Why the Sun Stood Still" (1950)
 . Collection of 41 stories and articles

Others
 
 
 
  (with Will Oursler). Biography
 
 
 Modern Parables (1950)
 A Child Life of Jesus (1951)
  Autobiography

See also
 The Greatest Story Ever Told (radio program)

References

External links
 
 
 
 Fulton Oursler. "The Road to Damascus", EWTN
 
 
 Anthony Abbot bibliography at Classic Crime Fiction
  at All About Magicians

1893 births
1952 deaths
20th-century American dramatists and playwrights
20th-century American novelists
American male novelists
American mystery writers
American magazine editors
American Roman Catholic religious writers
Burials at Gate of Heaven Cemetery (Hawthorne, New York)
Converts to Roman Catholicism from atheism or agnosticism
Harry Houdini
Writers from Baltimore
Novelists from Maryland
American male non-fiction writers
20th-century American male writers
Critics of Spiritualism